The Haitian nesophontes (Nesophontes zamicrus) is an extinct species of mammal in the family Nesophontidae. It was endemic to Hispaniola in the Caribbean (in both the Dominican Republic and Haiti).

References

Nesophontes
Mammals of Haiti
Mammals of the Caribbean
Extinct animals of Haiti
Mammals described in 1929
Taxonomy articles created by Polbot
Mammal extinctions since 1500